The 2013 FIBA Asia Champions Cup was the 24th staging of the FIBA Asia Champions Cup, the international basketball club tournament of FIBA Asia. The tournament was held in Amman, Jordan in September 13–21, 2013. The main venue was the Prince Hamzah Court. This marked the first occasion when Jordan have hosted any FIBA Asia event.

Foolad Mahan from Iran, after going undefeated in the entire tournament, won its first ever FIBA Asia Champions Cup title after defeating Al-Rayyan from Qatar in the final game, 84–74. It was the fifth time a club from Iran has won the championship.

ASU from the hosts Jordan, on the other hand, finished third in the tournament after defeating Al-Hala from Bahrain in the third-place game, 107-76.

Qualification
According to the FIBA Asia rules, the number of participating teams in the FIBA Asia Champions Cup is ten. Each of the six FIBA ASIA Sub-Zones had one place, and the host was automatically qualified. The other three places are allocated to the zones according to performance in the 2012 FIBA Asia Champions Cup.

* Withdrew.

Preliminary round

Group A

Group B

Final round

Quarterfinals

Semifinals 5th–8th

Semifinals

7th place

5th place

3rd place

Final

Final standing

References

External links 
 

2013
Champions Cup
Champions Cup
International basketball competitions hosted by Jordan